The 2010 congressional elections in Virginia were held November 2, 2010, to determine who will represent the state of Virginia in the United States House of Representatives. Representatives are elected for two-year terms; those elected served in the 112th Congress from January 2011 until January 2013.

Primary elections were held on June 9, 2010.

Overview

By district
Results of the 2010 United States House of Representatives elections in Virginia by district:

District 1

Republican incumbent Rob Wittman was challenged by Democratic nominee Krystal Ball, a 28-year-old accountant and businesswoman. Independent Green candidate Gail "for Rail" Parker (campaign site, PVS), businesswoman, retired U.S. Air Force officer, and Vice Chair of the Independent Green Party of Virginia, was also on the ballot.

In the Republican primary, Wittman won against self-described Tea Party movement member Catherine Crabill. Crabill's candidacy had been controversial due to her statements that the Second Amendment to the U.S. Constitution was intended to help citizens protect themselves from tyranny. and that citizens may have to turn from the ballot box to the bullet box. In 2009, Wittman and Virginia Governor Bob McDonnell refused to endorse her for the Virginia House of Delegates. McDonnell spokesman Tucker Martin stated, "It's absolutely wrong for any candidate of any party to refer to the actions of the President of the United States and members of the United States Congress as 'domestic terrorism,' and to threaten to resort to violence if one fails to prevail in elections." Crabill refused to retract her remarks, saying "Those are my convictions." Wittman voted against the Emergency Economic Stabilization Act of 2008 during the financial crisis, against economic stimulus packages, and against the Health Care and Education Reconciliation Act of 2010, so had been deemed by some commentators to be difficult to get to the right of. But there was also deemed to be good reason for Wittman to worry about the primary's outcome, given the anti-government mood of the country. Wittman defeated Crabill with approximately 90% of the vote.
VA - District 1 from OurCampaigns.com
Race ranking and details from CQ Politics
Campaign contributions from OpenSecrets
Race profile at The New York Times

District 2

Democratic incumbent Glenn Nye was challenged by Republican businessman Scott Rigell and Independent Kenny Golden (site, PVS), a retired Navy Commodore.

Rigell won the Republican primary election over four other businessmen: Ed Maulbeck, Ben Loyola, Army Brigadier General Bert Mizusawa, former Navy SEAL turned local business owner Scott Taylor, and Jessica Sandlin, a single mother of 5 native to Virginia Beach. Bert Mizusawa raised more money than any candidate in the last two periods, and was considered a frontrunner. Businessman Rigell was the other frontrunner, receiving major endorsements from Thelma Drake, and Bob McDonnell's daughter.
VA - District 2 from OurCampaigns.com
Race ranking and details from CQ Politics
Campaign contributions from OpenSecrets
Race profile at The New York Times

District 3

Democratic incumbent Bobby Scott was challenged by Republican nominee former JAG Chuck Smith (campaign site, PVS) of Virginia Beach, Libertarian James Quigley (campaign site, PVS) of Hampton, and Independent John Kelly (campaign site, PVS).

Scott has run unopposed in five of the last six elections in what is considered a "safe" Democratic district.  The district's current configuration dates to 1993, when the Justice Department ordered Virginia to create a majority-minority district.
Race ranking and details from CQ Politics
Campaign contributions from OpenSecrets
Race profile at The New York Times

District 4

Republican incumbent Randy Forbes was challenged by Democratic nominee Wynne LeGrow of Emporia. Forbes retained his seat by beating his Democratic challenger by earning 62% of votes cast.

Forbes was first elected to the House in 2001 to fill a vacancy caused by the death of ten-term Democratic Congressman Norman Sisisky. Forbes defeated Democratic State Senator Louise Lucas 52-48% that year. He ran unopposed by Democrats in 2002 and 2006. 
Race ranking and details from CQ Politics
Campaign contributions from OpenSecrets
Race profile at The New York Times

District 5

Incumbent Democrat Tom Perriello was challenged by Republican Robert Hurt, state Senator from Chatham, and independent Jeffrey A. Clark (campaign site, PVS), a businessman from Danville.

In 2008, Perriello defeated Republican incumbent Virgil Goode. Goode did not seek a rematch in 2010, although he said several Conservative groups asked him to run on a pro-Tea Party ticket, due to their dissatisfaction with the Republicans.

Hurt won the primary election over six other candidates: Republican activist Feda Kidd Morton, private real estate investor Laurence Verga, Albemarle County Supervisor Ken Boyd, businessman Ron Ferrin, Jim McKelvey from Franklin County, and Michael McPadden. Perriello faced no opposition in the Democratic primary.
VA - District 5 from OurCampaigns.com
Race ranking and details from CQ Politics
Campaign contributions from OpenSecrets
Race profile at The New York Times

Polling

District 6

Incumbent Republican Bob Goodlatte faced no primary opposition, and was re-elected to a 10th term in the general election on November 2, capturing 76% of the vote.

Jeff Vanke of Roanoke ran as an Independent, citing endorsements by the Modern Whig Party, American Centrist Party and Independent Green Party of Virginia, and received 13% of the vote.

Stuart Bain of Salem ran as a Libertarian and received 9% of the vote.

District 7

Incumbent Republican Congressman and U.S. House Minority Whip Eric Cantor sought a sixth term and faced no primary opposition. Rick Waugh (campaign site, PVS) was the Democratic nominee, and Floyd C. Bayne (campaign site, PVS) was the Independent Greens of Virginia and Tea Party supported candidate. Tea Party-supported independent candidate Herb Lux (campaign site) had his emergency appeal to the United States Supreme Court turned aside on October 1, 2010, and so did not appear on the ballot.
VA - District 7 from OurCampaigns.com
Race ranking and details from CQ Politics
Campaign contributions from OpenSecrets
Race profile at The New York Times

District 8

Democratic incumbent Jim Moran was challenged by Republican nominee Jay Patrick Murray, a retired United States Army Colonel, and Independent Green Party nominee Ron Fisher (campaign site, PVS), a retired U.S. Navy captain.

Moran ran for re-election for an 11th term, and faced no primary opposition. Former Republican primary candidates were:
Matthew Berry, an attorney and former clerk to U.S. Supreme Court Justice Clarence Thomas. Berry lost to Murray in a primary election on June 8.
Mark Ellmore, Republican nominee in the 2008 race.
Laurence Socci, lobbyist. Socci dropped out on March 23 and endorsed Berry.
Will Radle - formerly considering a run for the Republican nomination 
Race ranking and details from CQ Politics
Campaign contributions from OpenSecrets
Race profile at The New York Times

Polling

District 9

Democratic incumbent Rick Boucher was challenged by Republican nominee Morgan Griffith, the Majority Leader of the Virginia House of Delegates, and Independent Jeremiah Heaton (campaign site, PVS), a U.S. Army veteran, farmer and businessman.

Boucher, who had represented the district since 1983, was unopposed on the Democratic side. On the Republican side, Griffith was selected by a convention held on May 22, 2010 at Fort Chiswell High School in Max Meadows. Delegates to the convention were selected by 23 local committee mass meetings held between February 25 and April 29. Other Republican candidates for the nomination were: 
William Carr: retiree from Ararat
Adam Light: small business owner from Tazewell County
David Moore: former Lieutenant Colonel in the US Army from Tazewell County
Jessee Ring: retired engineer from Pulaski County.
Brandon Roop: tea party activist from Blacksburg
Jim Bebout, retiree, announced during a tea party protest

The 9th District covers much of Southwest Virginia.
VA - District 9 from OurCampaigns.com
Race ranking and details from CQ Politics
Campaign contributions from OpenSecrets
Race profile at The New York Times

District 10

Republican incumbent Frank Wolf was running for re-election for a 16th term. He was challenged by Democrat Jeff Barnett (campaign site, PVS) and Libertarian William Redpath.

Wolf was unopposed on the Republican side. Barnett won the Democratic primary election against Richard Anthony and Julien Modica.

Former candidates were:
Dennis Findley (D) - McLean resident and architect
Jim Trautz (R) - Loudoun County resident and former naval officer

The district, located in northern Virginia, includes some Washington, D.C. suburbs, but extends far west and north along the border of Maryland and West Virginia. In most Presidential elections of the past few decades, the district has been won by Republican candidates. The most recent exception is the 2008 election when Democratic then-Senator Barack Obama won the district, and became the first Democrat since Johnson to win Virginia's electoral votes. Republican Governor Mitt Romney won the district 2012, but President Obama again won Virginia.
Race ranking and details from CQ Politics
Campaign contributions from OpenSecrets
Race profile at The New York Times

District 11

Democratic incumbent Gerry Connolly faced Republican Keith Fimian, who lost to Connolly in 2008. Also on the ballot were Libertarian David L. Dotson (campaign site, PVS), Independent Green David William Gillis, Jr. (campaign site, PVS), and Independent Christopher F. DeCarlo (campaign site, PVS).

Connolly was unopposed for the Democratic nomination. Fimian won against Pat Herrity in the Republican primary election, beating him 56%-44%, with 35,890 votes cast.
VA - District 11 from OurCampaigns.com
Race ranking and details from CQ Politics
Campaign contributions from OpenSecrets
Race profile at The New York Times

References

External links
Virginia State Board of Elections 
Official candidate list
Virginia Candidates for U.S. Congress at Project Vote Smart
Virginia from OurCampaigns.com
Virginia Congressional Races in 2010 from Open Secrets (campaign contributions)
2010 National Congressional Ballot from Pollster.com

House - Virginia from the Cook Political Report

Virginia
2010
2010 Virginia elections